Sean Arnold (30 January 1941 – 15 April 2020) was an English actor. For his role as Harry Fisher in the BBC soap opera Doctors, he was nominated for Villain of the Year at the 2005 British Soap Awards.

Arnold was born in January 1941 in Wickwar, Gloucestershire, England.

He is known for his roles as Mr. Llewelyn in Grange Hill in the 1970s and 1980s, and as Barney Crozier in the 1980s BBC television series Bergerac. He played Commander Telson in the 1981 BBC Radio 4 science fiction serial
Earthsearch and the 1982 sequel Earthsearch II, and later appeared as the Chief Constable in Merseybeat. He also voiced every character in the 1984 James the Cat series.

His film credits include roles in North Sea Hijack (1979), Remembrance (1982), Haunters of the Deep (1984), Speaking of the Devil (1991), and Red Rose (2005).

He died in April 2020 at the age of 79.

Filmography

References

External links

1941 births
2020 deaths
English male television actors
Male actors from Gloucestershire